Gilo can also refer to:

 Gilo, a settlement/neighborhood in Jerusalem
 Har Gilo, an Israeli settlement near Jerusalem in the West Bank
 An alternative spelling of Giloh, a biblical city
 Gilo River, a river in the Gambela Region of southwestern Ethiopia
 The fruit of the Scarlet eggplant or the plant itself, formerly known as Solanum gilo but now placed with the widespread Solanum aethiopicum
 A nickname for retired English cricketer Ashley Giles
 Gilo of Paris, twelfth-century bishop and poet